Leptostylus gibbus is a species of beetle in the family Cerambycidae. It was described by Deeger in 1775.

References

Leptostylus
Beetles described in 1775
Taxa named by Charles De Geer